The Coosa rocksnail, scientific name †Leptoxis showalterii, also known as the "ribbed rocksnail", was a species of freshwater snails with an operculum, aquatic gastropod mollusks in the family Pleuroceridae.

This species was endemic to the United States. It is now extinct.

References 

Leptoxis
Extinct gastropods
Gastropods described in 1860
Taxonomy articles created by Polbot